Norbert Ferré (born September 23, 1975) is a French magician and artist manager.

He has an international career with his humorous manipulation act One for Two, Two for One, which he can play in nine languages, and his talent as a show presenter. Technically, he is a specialist in the field of scene manipulation, in cards and balls.

In the popular French book Magic for Dummies, he is one of the magicians cited in the chapter "Ten great characters of magic in France".

Biography

First steps 
Born September 23, 1975 in Marseille of a sales manager father and a liberal nurse mother, he is the youngest of the two children of the family. He studied business, as well as sociology and psychology, and finished with a master's degree. Except for some small anecdotal food work, he will fully enter the workforce directly as a professional artist.

It was at the age of 11, in 1986, that Norbert Ferré attended the magician Christian Preston's show at La Ciotat: it was love at first sight for this art. The gift of a traditional box of magic for children, reading all the magic books he can find, will strengthen his passion. At the age of 14, he was accepted at the Magicians Club of Marseille, affiliated to the F.F.A.P. Fédération Française des Artistes Prestidigitateurs: the national French federation of conjuring artists), a club of which he will become a few years later the president from 1998 to 2001.  He used at the time the pseudonym Maginor that he will give up in the year 1999 to present himself since under his patronymic real.

Artistic background 

Very quickly, in the different domains of prestidigitation (see illusionism, 2.2), Norbert Ferré will choose that of manipulation. He began, in 1989, to mount an act he decided to present in 1991, at the first magic contest Jean Eugene Robert-Houdin de Blois (he still performs under the stage name Maginor), he there wins a second prize that will encourage him. He will receive, on this occasion, the advice of Pierre Brahma, the only French at the time who won the Grand Prix at the FISM (sort of the Olympic Games of conjuring held every three years). Norbert Ferré continues to work on his act and presents it this time in the national contest of the AFAP (formerly name of the FFAP) in Perpignan in 1999.

He wins the third prize of manipulation. He submitted his act to the 26th Convention of the Royal Club of Magicians of Brussels in Belgium (Circle 86 of the International Brotherhood of Magicians, commonly called I.B.M.), he won the second place in the category of Manipulation. Six months later, he won the same prize at the 22nd FISM convention in Lisbon.  Having finished his studies, he chose to opt for the profession of an illusionist.

In September 2000, he became the first French artist to be invited by the international convention of magic organized by Tenyo. At this period, he played his shows in festivals and conventions of magic.

In 2003, at the 23rd FISM convention in The Hague in July, he won a first prize in the handling category and won the Grand Prix general in all categories, becoming "World Champion".

He will not compete anymore. In France, he will continue to perform in many festivals and magic conventions and will be, among others, one of the artists of the tour "The Night of Magic" programmed in many cities of the country. He will also be hired by the Crazy Horse (he will also be selected for tours abroad cabaret, the "Forever Crazy Horse Tour" in Spain, Russia...).  He is now also called a lot abroad; he will travel all over the world while performing in big cabarets, the important magic festivals. He will also perform in circuses. Finally, he will be seen in TV shows around the world.

Prizes and awards  

At the end of June 2000, he won the second place in manipulation at the 26th convention of the Royal Magicians Club of Brussels and at the  22nd FISM convention in Lisbon.

In 2001, he received in Las Vegas the Originality Award of the "World Magic Seminar 2001" and in December of the same year, The Magic Circle of London inducted him in the M.I.M.C. (Membership of the Inner Magic Circle with a gold star), the highest degree for its members.

In 2002, the Academy of the Magic Arts awarded him a Mandrake d’or in Paris.

In 2003, at the 23rd FISM convention in The Hague, he became World Champion in the handling category and won the Grand Prix in all categories.

The FISM Grand Prix was the last contest in which he participated, since then he has performed at the most famous festivals, conventions or cabarets around the world, and continues to receive honorary awards, such as those below.

Honorary Prizes 

In October 2003, the FFAP awarded him the gold medal Jean Eugène Robert-Houdin at the Aix-les-Bains Congress.

On July 5, 2005, he received the Medal of the City of Marseille.

Other significant awards include in the US, The Excellence Award (The Florida State Magicians' Club - Magic on the Beach XIII) or, in Spain: 2014 commemorative plaque conferred by the city of Tamarite de Litera in Spain (Pro-Tamarit Collective - Encuentro Nacional de Magos Florences Gili).

Synopsis of the act 

The synopsis resumes a parody principle of Strange Case of Dr Jekyll and Mr Hyde, somewhat in line with Jerry Lewis's "Dr. Jerry and Mister Love".

On a stage with minimal decoration (a pedestal table with a box marked "Surprise," a sign on which we read "Prediction"). Norbert Ferré will play two characters: the host, debonair, funny and clumsy, and the magician, very serious and skillful. The act begins with the host, whose task is to make the time pass pleasantly while waiting for the arrival of the great magician. This will be the occasion of some jokes, and a few taps, the host being very proud of his new shoes and holding to draw attention to them. After a tour of himself of the artist, the "great magician" is revealed: the act is no longer spoken, we hear, in the background, an excerpt from the musical "A Fiddler on the roof", and then begins a series of manipulations, flourishes, magical effects and great dexterity with balls and cards, for a few minutes.

The routine ends, the artist does again a turn on himself, and the first character, the debonair, makes his appearance again. This one goes to look for the sign prediction and returns it: what is marked surprises the spectators, who understands to have been handled. After some new jokes, the "great magician" is once again appearing for a new demonstration of dexterity. After this, one last time, we find the good-natured character, who will reveal the contents of the box with marked "surprise": again, the public will be surprised by what the box contains, and that is, in fact, an ultimate Magic trick. The act ends with some last touches of humour...

The act combines magical effects and exploits on frills to acting, a theatralization, following a precept known illusionists statement by Jean Eugène Robert-Houdin: "The magician is a comedian who plays the role of a magician".

Additional activities 

Norbert Ferré occasionally writes articles for magician's magazines, such as The FFAP's magazine of conjuring.

Since 19 March 2012, he has been president of the association "MAGEV - Charity magic," a foundation whose aim is to offer shows, balloon sculpting workshops, etc., to children who have experienced life (illness, abuse, etc.), and to adults with disabilities.

Notes

References

External links 
 Official website
 Fédération Internationale des Sociétés Magiques
 Fédération Française des Artistes Prestidigitateurs

1975 births
French magicians
Talent managers
Vaudeville performers
Talent agents
Entertainers from Marseille
Magic consultants
Living people